Ivan Tsochev (born 9 July 1954) is a Bulgarian wrestler. He competed in the men's freestyle 57 kg at the 1980 Summer Olympics.

References

1954 births
Living people
Bulgarian male sport wrestlers
Olympic wrestlers of Bulgaria
Wrestlers at the 1980 Summer Olympics
Sportspeople from Sofia